Cameron Dye (born April 9, 1959) is an American actor and singer. He played "Fred" in the movie Valley Girl (1983), and also had roles in The Last Starfighter (1984),  National Lampoon's Joy of Sex (1984), Body Rock (1984), Fraternity Vacation (1985), Scenes from the Goldmine (1987), Out of the Dark (1989),  Men at Work (1990), and The Tavern (1999).

Dye was born in New Orleans, Louisiana. Dye's family moved around the United States and in the mid-1970s he attended Sylvania High School in Sylvania, Ohio.  Later, Dye moved to California and attended Mills High School in Millbrae, California and UCLA. He was married to actress Laura San Giacomo from 1990–1998, with whom he has a son named Mason. He also has a son, Calvin, with actress Tracy Middendorf.

Dye is a founding member of The Actors' Gang theatre troupe and has performed in plays for the company.

Filmography

References

External links
 

1959 births
Living people
American male film actors
American male singers
American male stage actors
Male actors from New Orleans
People from Millbrae, California
20th-century American male actors
21st-century American male actors